Anthony Desmond Joseph Lovell,  (9 August 1919 – 17 August 1945) was a fighter pilot and flying ace of the Royal Air Force during the Second World War. He served in the Battle of Britain, on Malta, and over France, but was killed in a flying accident shortly after the war in Europe had ended.

Early life
He was the son of Stuart C. A. Lovell and of Clare Mary Lovell, of Portrush, Northern Ireland. It had been expected that he would train for the Roman Catholic priesthood but directly upon graduation from Ampleforth College he joined the Royal Air Force.

Royal Air Force service
Lovell joined the RAF on a short service commission in November 1937 and was commissioned acting pilot officer on 9 January 1938, graduating from No, 6 Flying Training School at RAF Netheravon he was posted to No. 41 Squadron RAF at RAF Catterick on 20 August 1938 flying Supermarine Spitfire Mark Ia fighters and confirmed pilot officer on 25 October 1938.
He was promoted flying officer on 25 May 1940.

Over Dunkirk on 31 May 1940 he shared the destruction of a Heinkel He 111 bomber and on 1 June 1940 he shared another. On 8 July 1940 Lovell claimed a Ju 86. In combat off Dover on 28 July 1940, he was attacked by a Messerschmitt Bf 109 reportedly flown by leading Luftwaffe fighter ace Werner Mölders of JG 51 and crashed on landing at RAF Manston. Lovell had been wounded in the thigh and was admitted to Margate Hospital. On 5 September 1940 he was shot down over the Thames Estuary and baled out unhurt. His Supermarine Spitfire (serial number "R 6885") crashed and burned out at South Benfleet. Lovell was appointed to command "B" Flight in October 1940 at RAF Hornchurch.
He was awarded the Distinguished Flying Cross on 26 November 1940 as a flight lieutenant flying with No. 41 Squadron RAF. His citation read:

Becoming a fighter controller for a period of rest he was promoted acting flight lieutenant on 25 May 1941. Lovell was promoted flight lieutenant on 25 October 1941, In October 1941 Lovell was given command of No. 145 Squadron RAF as acting squadron leader transferring to the Middle East with his squadron in spring 1942 but soon resigned his command in Egypt completely frustrated by the lack of aircraft for his squadron.
On 10 February 1942 he was awarded a Bar to the Distinguished Flying Cross as acting squadron leader commanding with No. 145 Squadron RAF. His citation states:

He was quickly posted back into action, to Malta in July 1942 to join No. 603 Squadron RAF and promoted temporary squadron leader on 1 June 1942. When the squadron was disbanded on 3 August 1942 it was partly incorporated into No. 1435 Flight RAF to form a full squadron with Lovell in command.

He was awarded the Distinguished Service Order on 30 October 1942 as squadron leader commanding a fighter squadron during the Battle of Malta. His citation reads:

After a rest at the beginning of 1943—during which he served as a fighter controller—Lovell was appointed to No. 242 Group as acting wing commander and was promoted full squadron leader on 9 April 1943. He led No. 322 Wing over Corsica and then No. 244 Wing during the invasion of Italy and the South of France.
He was awarded the American Distinguished Flying Cross on 14 November 1944 as acting wing commander. His brother Stuart was killed on active service with the RAF in 1944.

On 23 February 1945 Lovell was awarded a Bar to the Distinguished Service Order as a wing commander and fighter leader. As the war came to an end Lovell was serving as chief flight instructor at No. 71 Operational Training Unit at Ismailia, he returned to England in June 1945 and in July 1945 joined the RAF School of Air Support at Old Sarum.

His success as an air ace is recorded by eminent air warfare scholars Chris Shores and Clive Williams as 16 enemy aircraft destroyed, 6 shared destroyed, 2 probably destroyed, 9 damaged, 4 shared damaged and 1 destroyed on the ground. This was accomplished during 5 operational tours.

Death
On 17 August 1945 Lovell was killed when he crashed into a field adjoining Old Sarum airfield having lost height while performing aerobatics in a Spitfire Mark XII (serial number "EN234").

References

Bibliography
 

1919 births
1945 deaths
The Few
Companions of the Distinguished Service Order
Recipients of the Distinguished Flying Cross (United Kingdom)
Recipients of the Distinguished Flying Cross (United States)
Royal Air Force airmen
Royal Air Force wing commanders
British World War II flying aces
British World War II pilots
English aviators
People educated at Ampleforth College
Royal Air Force personnel killed in World War II